Sankt Georgen am Längsee is a municipality in the district of Sankt Veit an der Glan in Carinthia, Austria.

Geography
Sankt Georgen is located at the Längsee north of the Zollfeld Valley. In the east, the Gurk River flows southwards into the Klagenfurt basin. The municipal area comprises the cadastral communities of Goggerwenig, Gösseling, Launsdorf, Osterwitz, and Taggenbrunn as well as famous Hochosterwitz Castle in the south.

History
The settlement arose from the former Sankt Georgen monastery of Benedictine nuns established about 1002/08 by the local Countess Wichburg, a granddaughter of the Bavarian duke Eberhard. Rebuilt in a Baroque style, it was dissolved by order of Emperor Joseph II in 1783. Today the premises serve as a conference centre.

Politics
Seats in the municipal assembly (Gemeinderat)  elections:
Social Democratic Party of Austria (SPÖ): 11
Freedom Party in Carinthia (BZÖ): 8
Austrian People's Party (ÖVP): 3
ERNST (Independent): 1

Twin towns — sister cities

Sankt Georgen is twinned with:
 Zoppola, Italy

References

Cities and towns in Sankt Veit an der Glan District